Lecocarpus lecocarpoides is a species of flowering plant in the family Asteraceae. It is found only in Galápagos Islands, Ecuador.

References

lecocarpoides
Flora of the Galápagos Islands
Vulnerable plants
Taxonomy articles created by Polbot